The Villa de May is a historic mansion in Beaulieu-sur-Mer, France. It was built in 1826 for Gaétan de May. It was purchased by the city of Beaulieu-sur-Mer in 1967 and was designated a monument historique on 25 January 1980. It now houses a music conservatory.

References

Houses completed in 1826
Monuments historiques of Alpes-Maritimes